Javier Francisco Méndez Torres (born September 23, 1972 in Bacobampo, Sonora, Mexico) is a Mexican professional boxer in the Welterweight division. He's also the former Sinaloa State Welterweight and the WBC FECARBOX Welterweight Champion.

Pro career
Javier Francisco won Sinaloa State Welterweight Championship, when he beat Antonio Contreras in Mexico.

On June 27, 1998 Méndez lost to three-time world champion, Antonio Margarito in El Gran Mercado, Phoenix, Arizona.

WBC FECARBOX Welterweight Championship
In August 1998, he won the WBC FECARBOX Light Welterweight by upsetting title contender Eric Hernandez. He would go on to lose his title to Fitz Vanderpool.

References

External links

Boxers from Sonora
Welterweight boxers
1972 births
Living people
Mexican male boxers
People from Etchojoa Municipality